Abdul Afiq bin Roslan (born 20 January 1996) is a Bruneian footballer who plays as a midfielder for Kota Ranger FC. He has also appeared for Brunei Under-19.

Club career

Afiq began his club career in 2014 with Najip FC (renamed as Najip I-Team in 2015) of the Brunei Super League as one of several youth internationals recruited by Johari Bungsu for a squad overhaul, in place of a team that lost every game in the previous season. He appeared regularly for Najip I-Team in the following season, scoring three league goals to help his club to consecutive third-place finishes. He was selected by NFABD to play for Tabuan U21 in the 2016 season.

Afiq trialled for and joined Brunei's sole professional club DPMM FC's youth team in early 2015. He signed full terms on 15 January 2017, taking the number 17 shirt vacated by Na'im Tarif. He was released from the first team in June during the mid-season transfer window, to allocate for Brunei international Hazwan Hamzah. He rejoined Najip I-Team since, and scored against Lun Bawang FC on 13 August.

Afiq signed for Indera SC in early 2019 and scored a brace on his debut against Setia Perdana on 15 February. He left the club at the end of the season.

Afiq Joined Kota Ranger FC in the 2021 Brunei Super League season.

International career

Afiq was selected to play for the Brunei Under-19s at the 2013 AFF U-19 Youth Championship held in Indonesia in September, appearing once against Malaysia in a 5–0 loss. The following month Afiq travelled to Thailand for the 2014 AFC U-19 Championship qualifying matches and played once against North Korea in a 0–6 defeat.

References

External links 

1996 births
Living people
Association football midfielders
Bruneian footballers
DPMM FC players
Indera SC players